Pierre Garsau (7 November 1961 – 9 May 1997) was an Algerian born French male water polo player. He was a member of the France men's national water polo team. He competed with the team at the 1988 Summer Olympics and 1992 Summer Olympics.

See also
 France men's Olympic water polo team records and statistics
 List of men's Olympic water polo tournament top goalscorers

References

External links
 

1961 births
1997 deaths
French male water polo players
Water polo players at the 1988 Summer Olympics
Water polo players at the 1992 Summer Olympics
Olympic water polo players of France
People from Oran